The Thumby is a small keychain sized programmable game console produced by TinyCircuits of Akron, Ohio and funded by a Kickstarter campaign. The console measures .

History
The first concept for the Thumby originated roughly around 2015 or 2016. An early version of the system was shown at the 2016 Bay Area Maker Faire.

A Kickstarter crowdfunding campaign to raise money for the console began on September 28th, 2021. The company projected a production of at least 10,000 Thumby consoles despite the 2020–present global chip shortage. A stated goal was to ship consoles to backers by February 2022, with plans to ship some early units in Fall 2021. The console shipped in 2022.

Games
The Thumby includes six preloaded games:
TinySaur/Saur Run
Thumgeon
TinyTennis/Tennis
Annelid
Space Debris
TinyBlocks/TinyTris

Additional games can be downloaded from the internet on a personal computer, then loaded onto the console over USB.

Hardware
The Thumby is powered by a Raspberry Pi RP2040 microcontroller. The console provides 2MB of onboard storage. MicroPython is supported with a web based development environment.

A small  72x40 pixel 1-bit OLED panel is used as the display. A buzzer is also included for simple audio feedback.

A microUSB port is used to connect the console with computers, as well as to support the Thumby link cable. This port is also used to charge the lithium polymer battery, which provides about 2 hours of operational runtime with a capacity of 40mAh.

The console can be mounted on a keychain.

The console casing was made in a variety of colors including gray, dark gray, blue, pink, gold, green, and clear.

References

External links

Thumby Code Editor
Micro Python API

Handheld game consoles
Kickstarter-funded video game consoles
ARM-based video game consoles
Akron, Ohio
2020s toys
2022 in video gaming
Products introduced in 2022
Monochrome video game consoles